This article contains lists of U.S. states, the District of Columbia, and U.S. territories by annual median wage and annual mean wage.

The first table contains a list of U.S. states and territories by annual median income. The second table contains a list of U.S. states and territories by annual mean wage.

Average wage in the United States was $69,392 in 2020. Median income per person in the U.S. was $42,800 in 2019. The average is higher than the median because there are a small number of individuals with very high earnings, and a large number of individuals with relatively low earnings. (See Income inequality in the United States.)

Mean salary map 

Map of U.S. states by annual average salary (as of 2020).

List of U.S. states and territories by annual median wage

List of U.S. states and territories by annual mean wage

See also
List of countries by average wage
List of US states by minimum wage
List of U.S. states and territories by income
Personal income in the United States
Household income in the United States
List of lowest-income places in the United States
List of lowest-income counties in the United States
Thank God for Mississippi
List of European countries by average wage

References 

median wage
States by median wage
median wage
United states, median wage